Armend Sabit Dallku (born 16 June 1983) is an Albanian professional football coach and former player who is a current manager of Dukagjini, he represented Albania at under-21 and full international level collecting 64 international senior caps between years 2005–2013 and becoming part of top ten of list of Albania international footballers, remaining until March 2017 when he was overwrited by national side captain at the time Ansi Agolli.

Club career

Early career
Dallku was born in Vushtrri, and began his career at his hometown club KF Kosova Vushtrri. before transferring to Prishtina. Dallku's professional career started off in 2003 when he signed up with KF Prishtina. He spent the 2002–03 season there. In 2004, he moved to Elbasani, playing 25 games in all competitions.

Vorskla Poltava

In the summer of 2005, Dallku joined Ukrainian side Vorskla Poltava in the Ukrainian Premier League. He became one of the team's key players of the defending line. He scored two goals during the 2006–07 season.

On 1 May 2016, Dallku announced his retirement from professional football at the end of the season via a Facebook status. Fourteen, Dallku played his final match as a professional footballer in a 1–0 home loss to Oleksandriya in the final day of the season, ending thus his 13-year career, 11 of them with Vorskla Poltava.

Prishtina
On 14 June 2016, Dallku completed a transfer to his first senior club Prishtina, signing a one-year contract, taking the vacant squad number 4. He was presented on the same day along with players such as Ahmed Januzi and Debatik Curri, his former international teammates. Two weeks later, he was prompted new captain after the position was left vacant. Speaking of that, Dallku stated: "It doesn't matter who's the captain. The important thing is the team to work properly."

Dallku made his official debut with the club on 13 August in the Kosovan Supercup, where Prishtina beat 1–0 Feronikeli to win the first silverware of the season. He made his league debut on 19 August in the opening league match against Llapi, playing full-90 minutes in a 3–1 home success. He scored his first goal of the later on 22 October in the matchday 10 against Trepça.

On 14 January 2017, in the yearly ceremony held by Football Federation of Kosovo, Dallku was named in the 2016 Team of the Year along with his teammate Liridon Leci. He played 31 matches and scored one goal as Prishtina finished runner-up in the championship.

International career
Dallku received the Albanian citizenship on 16 August 2004.

In 2004 Dallku became part of the Albania national under-21 team managed by Hasan Lika playing in 4 first matches valid for the 2006 UEFA European Under-21 Championship qualification Group 2 where he completed full 90-minutes in each match, helping the team to take 1 win versus Kazakhstan and 1 draw against Greece.

His performances resulted in a call up from Senior team by coach Hans-Peter Briegel for the 2006 FIFA World Cup qualification (UEFA) 5th game against Ukraine on 9 February 2005. Briegel decided to give the 20-year-old defender a start as a centre-back on his debut against a very strong Ukraine side . Although he played well he was unable to stop Ukraine from scoring two goals on either side of the interval. He became regular part of the senior side as he was called up for the March's matches playing the full match against Turkey as right-back where Albania lost 2–0. In the next game against Greece coach Briegel left Dallku on the bench and to puting in the 85th minute with score at 2–0 but unable to change anything as Albania lost again. Dallku was returned to U-21 for June's matches playing the full 90-minutes against Denmark in a heavy defeat 7–0. He returned soon to senior side being an unused substitute against Kazakhstan on 3 September 2005, match won by Albania 2–1. He returned in action in October's month playing the full match against Ukraine as a centre-back in a 2–2 draw. Then 4 days later in the closing match against Turkey he played in the starting line up as a centre-back, receiving an yellow card in the 22nd minute with Albania losing home 0–1 by a 58th minute goal where Dallku was replaced in the 63rd minute.

He scored his first goal in a FIFA World Cup 2010 qualifier against Malta on 10 September 2008. The match ended 3–0 to Albania, which sent them to the top of their group ahead of giant teams such as Portugal, Sweden and Denmark.

He retired from international football on 6 March 2014 with 64 senior international caps and one goal. Dallku announced that he will play one last game against Kosovo, which was played on 13 November in Pristina. However, Dallku didn't play but was mentioned.

Personal life
Dallku's younger brother, Ardin (born 1 November 1994), is also a footballer who plays also as a defender and from 2012–2016 both brothers played each other at Vorskla Poltava.

Career statistics

Club

International

International goals
Albania score listed first, score column indicates score after each Dallku goal.

Honours

Club
Prishtina
Kosovar Superliga: 2003–04
Kosovar Supercup: 2016

Vorskla Poltava
Ukrainian Cup: 2008–09

Individual
Football Superleague of Kosovo Team of the Year: 2016
Sport Master in Ukraine

References

External links

 
 
 
 
 Armend Dallku profile at FSHF.org

1983 births
Living people
Sportspeople from Vushtrri
Kosovo Albanians
Association football defenders
Kosovan footballers
Albanian footballers
Albania international footballers
FC Prishtina players
KF Elbasani players
FC Vorskla Poltava players
Football Superleague of Kosovo players
Kategoria Superiore players
Ukrainian Premier League players
Albanian expatriate footballers
Expatriate footballers in Ukraine
Albanian expatriate sportspeople in Ukraine
Kosovan football managers
Albanian football managers
FC Prishtina managers